My Roaring 20's Acoustic is a studio album by rock group Cheap Girls. It is an acoustic version of their 2009 release My Roaring 20's. It was released digitally on January 14, 2013, on Quote Unquote Records. Dan Jaquint was the engineer and also mixed the album. It was mastered in 2013 by Rick Johnson at his Cold War Studios.

Recording
The album was recorded in January 2010 in Dimondale, Michigan.

Release
The album was made available to download free of charge from Quote Unquote Records' website with donations being accepted to help pay for medical bills related to bass player Ian Graham's knee surgery.

Track listing

References

2013 albums
Cheap Girls albums